Specificity may refer to:

 Being specific (disambiguation)
 Specificity (statistics), the proportion of negatives in a binary classification test which are correctly identified
 Sensitivity and specificity, in relation to medical diagnostics
 Specificity (linguistics), whether a noun phrase has a particular referent as opposed to referring to any member of a class
 Specificity (symbiosis), the taxonomic range an organism associates with in a symbiosis
 Particular, as opposed to abstract, in philosophy
 Asset specificity, the extent that investments supporting a particular transaction have a higher value than if they were redeployed for any other purpose
 Domain specificity, theory that many aspects of cognition are supported by specialized learning devices
 Specificity theory, theory that  pain is "a specific sensation, with its own sensory apparatus independent of touch and other senses"
 Cascading Style Sheets#Specificity, determines which styles are applied to an html element when more than one rule could apply.
 Chemical specificity, in chemistry and biochemistry, with regard to enzymes or catalysts and their substrates

See also
 Species (disambiguation)
 Specification (disambiguation)
 Specialty (disambiguation)
 Site-specific (disambiguation)
 Language for specific purposes